Final Furlong is a horse racing video game developed by Namco and released in arcades in 1997. The game is one of only two known games to run on Namco System 22.5 Gorgon hardware, an early revision of the Namco System 23 hardware.

Gameplay

There are three tracks to choose from:  furlongs, 1 mile and  miles. Horses are classified according to where their best pace is: Leader (maintains highest speed when in first place), Front Runner (best pace is between second and fourth), Mid-Runner (best pace is when between fifth and seventh place), Strong Finisher (who is fastest at the end of the race), and two Almighty Runners (who keep their pace in any position). 

Players sit in a "saddle" and must then rock the cabinet's horses back and forth, to urge their horses forward, pressing the "Whip" button to speed them up and pulling on "reins" to keep the horse from colliding with the fences or other horses.

Reception
Gerald Lynch, writing for TechRadar, placed it among a list of "The 50 best arcade games of all time, ever," saying "This machine was brutal - popping you astride a giant plastic horse, you’d propel yourself forward by “geeing up” your steed, rocking manically forwards and backwards to speed the beast up. Best played with two players, the marathon-like events would last so long you wouldn't be able to walk for a week."

Final Furlong was listed in the book 1001 Video Games You Must Play Before You Die.

References

External links

1997 video games
Arcade video games
Arcade-only video games
Horse racing video games
Namco arcade games
Racing video games
Video games developed in Japan